The pale rockfinch or pale rock sparrow (Carpospiza brachydactyla) is a small sparrow found in the Middle East and Central Asia. It is the only member of the genus Carpospiza. Some authorities include it in the genus Petronia. Others have placed it in the finch family due to some similarities in behaviour and form, but the anatomy of its tongue exhibits characteristic sparrow features.

The range of pale rockfinch extends from eastern Turkey to Afghanistan, and south into the Arabian Peninsula and northern Africa as far as Ethiopia. Its natural habitats are subtropical or tropical dry shrubland and temperate grassland.

The breeding pattern of the pale rock sparrow is associated with specific aspects of habitat. Presence of this species is associated with temperature, grasshopper and beetle abundance, whereas density is associated with available habitat. Since available habitat plays a role on the density of pale rockfinches, rapidly growing villages and cultivation are a threat to the population.

References

External links
Pale rock sparrow at ARKive

pale rockfinch
Birds of Azerbaijan
Birds of Western Asia
Birds of the Middle East
pale rockfinch
pale rockfinch